Tubercliopsis is a genus of very small sea snails, marine gastropod molluscs in the family Cerithiopsidae, the cerithids.

Species
 Tubercliopsis bowenensis Laseron, 1956
 Tubercliopsis capricornia Laseron, 1956
 Tubercliopsis cataldinii Cecalupo & Perugia, 2013
 Tubercliopsis cessicus (Hedley, 1906)
 Tubercliopsis conica Cecalupo & Perugia, 2012
 Tubercliopsis elongata Laseron, 1956
 Tubercliopsis exigua (Laseron, 1951)
 Tubercliopsis filofusca (Laseron, 1951)
 Tubercliopsis georgensis (Laseron, 1951)
 Tubercliopsis lanceolata Cecalupo & Perugia, 2013
 Tubercliopsis lata Laseron, 1956
 Tubercliopsis literalis (Laseron, 1951)
 Tubercliopsis lorenzoi Cecalupo & Perugia, 2012
 Tubercliopsis macalpinei (Laseron, 1951)
 Tubercliopsis maxi Cecalupo & Perugia, 2012
 Tubercliopsis minor Cecalupo & Perugia, 2012
 Tubercliopsis miranda Cecalupo & Perugia, 2012
 Tubercliopsis philippinensis Cecalupo & Perugia, 2012
 Tubercliopsis punicea Laseron, 1956
 Tubercliopsis sebyi Cecalupo & Perugia, 2012
 Tubercliopsis septapilia (Laseron, 1951)
 Tubercliopsis subtilis Cecalupo & Perugia, 2018
 Tubercliopsis violacea Cecalupo & Perugia, 2012
SDynonyms
 Tubercliopsis dannevigi (Hedley, 1911): synonym of Prolixodens dannevigi (Hedley, 1911)
 Tubercliopsis infracolor (Laseron, 1951): synonym of Prolixodens infracolor (Laseron, 1951)
 Tubercliopsis quinquepilia (Laseron, 1951): synonym of Clathropsis quinquepilia (Laseron, 1951)
 Tubercliopsis septipilia [sic]: synonym of Tubercliopsis septapilia (Laseron, 1951) (misspelling)
 Tubercliopsis turgida Cecalupo & Perugia, 2012: synonym of Synthopsis noninii Cecalupo & Perugia, 2012: synonym of Costulopsis noninii (Cecalupo & Perugia, 2012)

References

 Laseron, C. F. (1956). The family Cerithiopsidae (Mollusca) from the Solanderian and Dampierian zoogeographical provinces. Australian Journal of Marine and Freshwater Research. 7 (1): 151-182.

Cerithiopsidae